In a country that is split into two or more non-adjacent parts, with another country in between, an extraterritorial crossroad is a strip of land that formally belongs to neither country, or with other special arrangements. Often these strips of land are to be formally administered by the United Nations.

Examples of extraterritorial crossroads include:

 Germany after World War I. The Polish corridor to the Baltic Sea separated East Prussia from the rest of Germany. East Prussians chose for their area to remain a German exclave. The Seedienst Ostpreußen provided transport as trains on the Polish controlled former Prussian Eastern Railway section were rather slow. Poles declined Hitler's proposals to build an extraterritorial Autobahn, through the Danzig Corridor, which was used by the Germans as a pretext to attack Poland and thus begin World War II.
 Germany after World War II. By land, West Berlin could only be accessed by transit roads through the GDR
 In Finland between 1945 and 1956, crossing through the Soviet-occupied Porkkala was necessary because the main railway line crossed through the territory. However, during a crossing, all the windows of the train were closed with shutters, the locomotive was exchanged into a Soviet locomotive and Soviet military police occupied the train during the crossing.

Extraterritorial crossroads were proposed in:

 The 1947 UN Partition Plan of Palestine to connect the sections of the Arab state together and to connect sections of the Jewish State together
 Some peace plans for former Yugoslavia

Extraterritorial crossroads can be compared to buffer zones such as the one in Cyprus. Buffer zones are legally similar, but the purpose is to separate two countries, rather than to facilitate movement.

See also
 Demilitarized zone
 Enclave and exclave

Borders